Poochakkanni (also written Poocha Kanni)  is a 1966 Indian Malayalam-language film,  directed by Puttanna Kanagal and produced by A. L. Sreenivasan and P. Arunachalam. The film stars Prem Nazir, Adoor Bhasi, Thikkurissy Sukumaran Nair and Vijaya Nirmala. The film is based on the Kannada novel Bekkina Kannu by Triveni. The film's score was composed by M. S. Baburaj.

A singer talks about recording the songs for the movie.

Cast
Prem Nazir
Adoor Bhasi
Thikkurissy Sukumaran Nair
Vijaya Nirmala
Bahadoor
Kalavathi
Meena
Usharani

Soundtrack
The music was composed by M. S. Baburaj with lyrics by Vayalar Ramavarma.

References

External links

1960s Malayalam-language films
Films directed by Puttanna Kanagal